The 1933 Canisius Griffins football team was an American football team that represented Canisius College in the Western New York Little Three Conference (Little Three) during the 1933 college football season. Canisius compiled a 6–1–1 record (0–1–1 in the Little Three), shut out six of eight opponents, and outscored all opponents by a total of 210 to 35. William "Hiker" Joy was the head coach for the first year. Quarterback Hank Turgeon was the team captain.

Schedule

References

Canisius
Canisius Golden Griffins football seasons
Canisius Griffins football